And the Same to You is a 1960 British boxing-themed comedy film directed by George Pollock and starring Brian Rix and William Hartnell. It is based on a stage farce by A.P. Dearsley.

Premise
Stuck with the nickname "Dreadnought", Dickie Marchant (Brian Rix) feels he has no choice but to pursue a career as a boxer. However, to mollify his uncle (Leo Franklyn), Marchant pretends to be the soul of religiosity, while his tough-talking manager, Walter 'Wally' Burton (William Hartnell), poses as a man of the cloth.

Cast
 Brian Rix as Dickie 'Dreadnought' Marchant
 William Hartnell as Walter 'Wally' Burton 
 Leo Franklyn as Rev. Sydney Mullett 
 Tommy Cooper as Horace Hawkins 
 Vera Day as Cynthia Tripp
 Sid James as Sammy Gatt  
 Miles Malleson as Bishop  
 Arthur Mullard as Tubby  
 Renee Houston as Mildred Pomphret  
 Dick Bentley as George Nibbs  
 John Robinson as Archdeacon Humphrey Pomphret  
 Terry Scott as Police Constable  
 Shirley Anne Field as Iris Collins  
 Ronald Adam as Trout  
 Tony Wright as Percy 'Perce' Gibbons
 Larry Taylor as Chappy Tuck
 Rupert Evans as Butch
 Tommy Duggan as Mike
 George Leech as Jake
 Lindsay Hooper as Bert Bender
 Jean Clark as Manicurist
 Jennifer Phipps as Secretary
 Jack Taylor as M.C.
 Micky Wood as Referee
 Bob Simmons as Perce's Opponent

Box Office
The film and Inn for Trouble were voted by Kine Weekly as the best British box office double bill for the year 1960.

References

External links
 

1960 films
1960 comedy films
British boxing films
British comedy films
British films based on plays
Films directed by George Pollock
Films with screenplays by Terry Nation
Films with screenplays by John Paddy Carstairs
Films shot at Nettlefold Studios
1960s English-language films
1960s British films